Twosret, also spelled  Tawosret or Tausret (d. 1189 BC conventional chronology) was the last known ruler and the final pharaoh of the Nineteenth Dynasty of Egypt. 

She is recorded in Manetho's Epitome as a certain Thuoris, who in Homer is called Polybus, husband of Alcandra, and in whose time Troy was taken.  She was said to have ruled Egypt for seven years, but this figure included the nearly six-year reign of Siptah, her predecessor.  Twosret simply assumed Siptah's regnal years as her own.  While her sole independent reign would have lasted for perhaps one to one and a half years from 1191 to 1189 BC, this number now appears more likely to be two full years instead, possibly longer. Excavation work by the University of Arizona Egyptian Expedition  on her memorial temple ("temple of millions of years") at Gournah strongly suggests that it was completed and functional during her reign and that Twosret started a regnal year 9, which means that she had two and possibly three independent years of rule, once one deducts the nearly six-year reign of Siptah.  Her royal name, Sitre Meryamun, means "Daughter of Re, beloved of Amun."

Family 

Twosret or Tausret's birth date is unknown. She is thought to have been a daughter of Merneptah, possibly a daughter of Takhat, thereby making her sister to Amenmesse.

Queen consort

She was thought to be the second royal wife of Seti II. There are no children for Twosret and Seti II, unless tomb KV56 represents the burial of their daughter.

Theodore Davis identified Twosret and her husband in a cache of jewelry found in tomb KV56 in the Valley of the Kings. This tomb also contained objects bearing the name of Rameses II.  There is no consensus about the nature of this tomb.  Some (Aldred) thought this was the tomb of a daughter of Seti II and Tawosret, but others (Maspero) thought this was a cache of objects originally belonging with the tomb of Tawosret herself.

Regent
After her husband's death, she became first regent to Seti's heir Siptah jointly with Chancellor Bay. Siptah was likely a stepson of Twosret since his mother is now known to be a certain Sutailja or Shoteraja from Louvre Relief E 26901.

Pharaoh
When Siptah died, Twosret officially assumed the throne for herself, as the "Daughter of Re, Lady of Ta-merit, Twosret of Mut", and assumed the role of a Pharaoh.

While it was commonly believed that she ruled Egypt with the aid of Chancellor Bay, a recently published document by Pierre Grandet in a BIFAO 100 (2000) paper shows that Bay was executed on Siptah's orders during Year 5 of this king's reign. The document is a hieratic ostracon or inscribed potshard and contains an announcement to the workmen of Deir El-Medina of the king's actions. No immediate reason was given to show what caused Siptah to turn against "the great enemy Bay," as the ostracon states. The recto of the document reads thus:

Year 5 III Shemu the 27th. On this day, the scribe of the tomb Paser came announcing 'Pharaoh, life, prosperity, and health!, has killed the great enemy Bay'.

This date accords well with Bay's last known public appearance in Year 4 of Siptah. The ostracon's information was essentially a royal order for the workmen to stop all further work on Bay's tomb since the latter had now been deemed a traitor to the state.

Meanwhile, Egyptian territories in Canaan seem to have become effectively independent under the overlordship of a man called Irsu. Papyrus Harris I, the main source on these events, seems to claim that Irsu and Twosret had allied themselves, leaving Irsu free to plunder and neglect the land.

End of Twosret's reign
Twosret's reign ended in a civil war, which is documented in the Elephantine stela of her successor Setnakhte, who became the founder of the Twentieth dynasty. It is not known if she was overthrown by Setnakhte or whether she died peacefully in her own reign; if the latter is the case, then a struggle may have ensued among various factions at court for the throne in which Setnakhte emerged victorious. However, Setnakhte and his son Ramesses III described the late 19th dynasty as a time of chaos. Setnakhte usurped the joint KV14 tomb of Seti II and Twosret but reburied Seti II in tomb KV15, while deliberately replastering and redrawing all images of Twosret in tomb KV14 with those of himself. Setnakhte's decisions here may demonstrate his dislike and presumably hatred for Twosret since he chose to reinter Seti II but not Twosret.

Setnakhte's son, Ramesses III, later excluded Twosret and even Siptah of the 19th dynasty from his Medinet Habu list of Egyptian kings thereby delegitimizing them in the eyes of the citizenry. It appears more likely that Setnakhte overthrew Twosret from power in a civil war.

Twosret's highest known date is a Year 8 II Shemu day 29  hieratic inscription found on one of the foundation blocks (FB 2) of her mortuary temple at Gournah in 2011 by the University of Arizona Egyptian Expedition. Since this was only a foundation inscription and Twosret's temple, although never finished as planned, was at least partially completed, it is logical to assume that some time must have passed before her downfall and the termination of work on her temple project. Richard Wilkinson stressed that Twosret's mortuary temple was "largely structurally completed," although bearing minimal decoration; therefore, she would have ruled for several more months beyond II Shemu 29 of her 8th Year for her temple to reach completion. Further study by Pearce Paul Creasman has concluded that the temple was "functionally complete." She could, hence, have possibly ruled for 6 to 20 more months after the inscription date to achieve these levels of completion, thus starting her 9th regnal year around the interval of IV Akhet/I Peret—when her husband died (since she assumed Siptah's reign as her own) or perhaps longer—before Setnakhte's rule began. Or she could have had a nearly full 9th year reign, including the 6-year reign of Siptah.

Monuments and inscriptions
It is believed that expeditions were conducted during her reign to the turquoise mines in Sinai and in Palestine and statues have been found of her at Heliopolis and Thebes. Her name is also found at Abydos, Hermopolis, Memphis, and in Nubia.

Inscriptions with Twosret's name appear in several locations:
 The Bilgai Stela belonged to Twosret. It records the erection of a monument in the area of Sebennytos.
 A pair statue of Tawosret and Siptah is now in the Staatliche Sammlung für Ägyptische Kunst Munich (no 122). Siptah is shown seated on Twosret's lap.
 In the temple at Amada, Twosret is depicted as a Great Royal Wife and God's Wife.
 A statue from Heliopolis depicts Twosret and her names are inscribed with a mixture of male and female epithets. Twosret herself is depicted as a woman.
 A cartouche of hers believed to come from Qantir in the Delta has been found
 Twosret and Siptah's names have been found associated with the turquoise mines at Serabit el Khadim and Timna (in the Sinai & Palestine).
 A faience vase bearing a cartouche of Twosret was found at Tell Deir Alla in Jordan.
 Twosret constructed a Mortuary temple next to the Ramesseum, but it was never finished and was only partially excavated (by Flinders Petrie in 1897), although recent re-excavation by Richard H. Wilkinson and Pearce Paul Creasman shows it is more complex than first thought. The temple is being excavated by the Tausert Temple Project (2004 to present).

Tomb 
Twosret's KV14 tomb in the Valley of the Kings has a complicated history; it was started in the reign of Seti II. Scenes show Tawosret accompanying Siptah, but Siptah's name had later been replaced by that of Seti II.  The tomb  was then usurped by Setnakht, and extended to become one of the deepest royal tombs in the valley while Tawosret's sarcophagus was reused by Amenherkhepeshef in KV13. Altenmuller believes that Seti II was buried in one of the rooms in KV14 and later reburied in KV15. Others question this scenario.

A mummy found in KV35 and known as Unknown Woman D has been identified by some scholars as possibly belonging to Twosret, but there is no other evidence for this other than the correct Nineteenth Dynasty period of mummification.

References

Bibliography
 Gae Callender, "The Cripple, the Queen & the Man from the North", KMT, Vol:17 No.1, Spring 2006, pp. 49–63
 Leonard H. Lesko, "A Little More Evidence for the End of the Nineteenth Dynasty", Journal of the American Research Center in Egypt, Vol. 5, (1966), pp. 29–32 (accessible through JSTOR)
 Richard H. Wilkinson (ed.), Tausret: Forgotten Queen & Pharaoh of Egypt, Oxford University Press, 2012.

12th-century BC Pharaohs
Pharaohs of the Nineteenth Dynasty of Egypt
Female pharaohs
Queens consort of the Nineteenth Dynasty of Egypt
12th-century BC women rulers
13th-century BC births
1189 BC deaths
13th-century BC clergy
12th-century BC clergy
13th-century BC Egyptian women
Late Bronze Age collapse
12th-century BC Egyptian women
Regents of Egypt